The Destination is the debut mini album by Thai singer-songwriter and the 1st runner-up of True Visions' Academy Fantasia season 4, Vontongchai Intarawat, as a solo artist. The official release date of this album is May 8, 2008. The album contains a special CD+VCD package (5 tracks and 5 karaoke videos).

Track listing

Charts

External links 
 True Life: Tol – The Destination 
 True Life: 4 albums from AF4 press release 

2008 EPs